Eli McKinley Underwood (January 29, 1907 – October 2000) was an American Negro league outfielder in the 1930s.

A native of Marion, Alabama, Underwood played for the Detroit Stars in 1937. In 20 recorded games, he posted ten hits with a home run in 68 plate appearances. Underwood died in Aurora, Colorado in 2000 at age 93.

References

External links
 and Seamheads

1907 births
2000 deaths
Date of death missing
Detroit Stars (1937) players
Baseball outfielders
Baseball players from Alabama
People from Marion, Alabama
20th-century African-American sportspeople